The Wolfsnächte Tour 2013 was a European concert tour by German power metal band Powerwolf. Supporting the release of their fifth studio album Preachers of the Night, the tour ran from 26 September 2013 to 3 November 2013, taking place in France, United Kingdom, Germany, Netherlands, Switzerland, Czech Republic and Belgium.

Background 
Powerwolf's fifth album Preachers of the Night was released on 19 July 2013. The tour dates were announced in April 2013. Majesty, Battle Beast, Ashes of Ares and Wisdom served a series of opening acts for Powerwolf during the tour. The tour was set to begin on 26 September 2013 at the Le Divan du Monde in Paris, France. It was set to end on 3 November 2013 at Baroeg in Rotterdam, Netherlands.

Set list 
This setlist is representative of the show on 29 October 2013 in Prague, Czech Republic, at the Retro Music Hall. It does not represent all dates throughout the tour.

 "Lupus Daemonis"
 "Sanctified with Dynamite"
 "Prayer in the Dark"
 "Amen & Attack"
 "All We Need Is Blood"
 "Sacred & Wild"
 "Resurrection by Erection"
 "Coleus Sanctus"
 Drum solo
 "Kreuzfeuer"
 "Werewolves of Armenia"
 "Dead Boys Don't Cry"
 "We Drink Your Blood"
 "Lupus Dei"
 "Opening: Prelude to Purgatory"
 "Raise Your Fist, Evangelist"
 "Saturday Satan"
 "In the Name of God (Deus Vult)"
 "Wolves Against the World"

Tour dates

Notes

References

External links 
 Official Powerwolf website

2013 concert tours
Powerwolf concert tours
Concert tours of Europe
Concert tours of France
Concert tours of the United Kingdom
Concert tours of Germany